The Crossing is a two-part 2014 Chinese-Hong Kong epic historical romance-war drama (part 1) and disaster film (part 2) directed by John Woo and written by Hui-Ling Wang. The film stars Zhang Ziyi, Takeshi Kaneshiro, Song Hye-kyo, Huang Xiaoming, Tong Dawei and Masami Nagasawa. The film is based on the sinking of the Taiping in 1949. The incident led to the deaths of over 1,500 passengers and crew. The film's first part was released in China on December 2, 2014. Part two was released on July 30, 2015.

Plot 
Part 1:

In a battle between the Chinese National Revolutionary Army and the Imperial Japanese Army in Manchuria during World War II, Major general Lei Yifang (Huang Xiaoming) personally leads an attack over the objections of his subordinates. The charge overruns Japanese lines and wins the day; Dr. Yen Zekun (Takeshi Kaneshiro), an ethnic Chinese field medic conscripted into the Japanese army from then-Japanese Taiwan, is captured. Lei is promoted to lieutenant general, while Dr. Yen is shipped off to a prison camp in Fengtian. On the POW train, Yen reads a letter from his Japanese paramour Masako (Masami Nagasawa).

A few years later during the resumption of the Chinese Civil War, Yu Zhen (Zhang Ziyi), a poor, illiterate young woman volunteers as an orderly at a Nationalist hospital in Shanghai. She dreams of reuniting with her boyfriend Yang Tianhu, who is off fighting the Communists. Meanwhile, General Lei catches the eye of wealthy debutante Zhou Yunfen (Song Hye-kyo) at a charity event put on by her father Zhou Zhongding and mother Yuan Shenglan. Despite her mother's warnings not to accept the attention of soldiers, she dances with Lei, their chemistry obvious for the entire room to see; months later, they marry.

The next year, Yu Zhen meets signal corps sergeant Tong Daqing outside of the same photography studio Lei and Zhou used for their wedding. Sergeant Tong has hired Yu and a borrowed baby to have a photograph taken together as a family as proof of marriage, which would provide his parents at home with more food rations. After they take the photos, a student anti-war protest in front of the studio is violently dispersed by police and soldiers. During the chaos, Dr. Yen enters the photography studio, presents separate photos of himself and Masako, and asks the proprietor to create an altered photo that will make it look like he and her were in a photo together.

Tong and Yu take refuge in a noodle shop, where Tong talks about why he joined the army. Yu asks about the Republic of China Army's soldier identification numbers. Tong tells her that as long as she knows his ID number, she will be able to find him, dead or alive. She smiles, thinking of her lover, but Tong misinterprets this as her having feelings for him. Tong, late for his departure, boards a truck with the rest of his unit and tells Yu to memorize his unit number. Yu returns to the photography studio and orders a copy of the picture of her with Tong and "their" baby.

Zhou, now pregnant, tells General Lei that she has reservations about his plans to send her away to Taiwan. He quiets her fears, though she asks him not to see her off out of superstition. Zhou's parents see her and her sister off on the Taiping, along with many of Shanghai's elite. Zhou has her cousin take a picture of her, capturing Lei in the background as he has come in secret to watch her departure before he leaves for the front.

Sergeant Tong is admiring his 'family portrait' when his fellow troops notice how pretty his 'wife' is. They pass the photo around and listen, rapt as Tong spins yarns about Yu. Meanwhile, Yu struggles to get employment and is seen eating discarded fruit and sleeping under a bridge.

Dr. Yen, who was on the Taiping with the Zhou sisters, disembarks with them at the Port of Keelung in Taiwan, where they are greeted with a military band and Nationalist flags lining the streets. He explains to an official that he was in Shanghai procuring medical supplies for his practice. The official, seeing that he is a native of Taiwan, asks where Yen learned the Guānhuà he is conversing in instead of the local language, Taiwanese Hokkien. After the questioning, Yen meets his brother and returns to his family home. His mother, a midwife, is burning letters sent to Yen by Masako. Zhou arrives at a Japanese-style estate, where she is welcomed by A-man, the Taiwanese maid. She starts to pen a letter to her husband.

Yu enters a boardinghouse in Shanghai. The landlady isn't looking to rent to single women, but Yu says she is married, using the photo of her and Captain Tong as evidence, and Yu is granted a place to stay. She then gets a hometown acquaintance of hers to bring her to work as a dancing girl at a club. Her friend reads aloud a letter from Yu's boyfriend before a big battle some four months ago. Her friend advises Yu that her boyfriend may be dead by now, and that romance won't keep her fed. Upon arriving at the dance club, they find that the city government has shut down the club in order to conserve energy for the war effort. The dancing girls, now out of work, protest but are roughly treated by baton-wielding police. Yu escapes from the fracas and starts a career of prostitution to secure enough money to travel to Taiwan in hopes of finding her missing lover. The drunken johns are noisy and waken the rest of the boardinghouse.

Lei's 12th Army is nearing encirclement during the Huaihai Campaign, and their supply lines have been cut. He orders a breakout towards Yongcheng, but an order comes in countermanding him to hold his position. He angrily goes to his headquarters, where his commanding general tells him that two recent breakout efforts have badly failed, likely due to the People's Liberation Army getting wind of the plans. Lei laments how he has returned to the same battlegrounds he fought on against the Japanese, only this time his men were dying against their countrymen instead of against foreign invaders.

Back in Taiwan, Zhou goes to replace a painting in her music room with one of her wedding day. In doing so, she discovers Masako's diary along with some original sheet music, revealing that this house is the one once occupied by Masako. While mediating a dispute between A-man and her manservant, Zhou collapses, bitten on the ankle by a snake. She is rushed to a doctor, who happens to be Yen. Zhou recognizes his name from the painting Masako's diary was concealed behind.

Zhou asks Dr. Yen to meet in private, and they do so at a lighthouse. She shows him Masako's diary, expressing that she wants to use Masako's sheet music as the beginning of the song she wants to write for her husband Lei. Zhou asks Yen to tell her about Masako for inspiration, thus starting a friendship anchored by their shared longing for a distant beloved. Yen explains he met Masako as they were both artists, and that his mother sold Masako's mother the piano now belonging to Zhou after his father's death. His mother and the other local Taiwanese never much approved of his relationship with Masako, as she was one of the colonizers.

Sergeant Tong is penning a letter to Yu in the trenches when General Lei comes by and asks Tong to help fix his radio. After Tong succeeds in doing so, the two bond over their family photos.

In the Communist camp, the local populace arrives with food and supplies for the soldiers, whose morale is greatly increased. At the same time, the Nationalist soldiers are starving. Unable to see his soldiers suffer, General Lei shoots his own warhorse for meat. Sergeant Tong, out on patrol with an enlisted soldier local to the area, shoots a rabbit but finds himself held at gunpoint by a Communist soldier. They manage to come to a truce, and the three of them eat the rabbit.

The Nationalists are subject to propaganda blaring from the Communist trenches, which also serves to cover the sounds of Communist sappers tunneling through the trenches. Lei, angry, rouses his troops and sends Tong off to figure out why the 108th Division has been incommunicado. Tong and his enlisted companion drive down the wire, stopping to connect their phone and try the 108th, which does not answer. Communist general Liu Zhiqing, an old acquaintance of Lei's, arrives at Lei's command post for a parley. He advises Lei to surrender, but Lei refuses.

Tong runs into a checkpoint guarded by the 108th Division and realizes that they have defected to the Communists. He convinces them not to kill him or hold him hostage, quickly returning to the rest of the 12th Army. When he goes to make his report, his companion, who has also defected, holds him at gunpoint. Tong turns his back to his companion and encourages him to shoot, but his companion cannot do it.

Lei finally receives the order to break out. He gathers his officers and announces that no one is obligated to stay and fight, but they all choose to remain with him. As the fight begins, sergeant Tong reports to General Lei and asks to be court-martialed. Lei doesn't understand why until he mutters that they can win if the 108th joins the fray now, and Tong explains that the 108th has deserted. Lei pulls his FN Model 1910 and holds it to Tong's temple, but ends up handing Tong's rifle back to him and exhorting Tong to fight on. As the Communists burst through and start to overrun the Nationalist positions, Tong is badly burned pushing Lei out of the way of an exploding truck. Lying together injured, Lei asks Tong why he came back. Tong confesses that he lied about having a wife and kids and felt guilty about how much Lei trusted him. Lei entrusts Tong with his diary of writings addressed to his wife Zhou and orders Tong to make sure she receives the diary. Lei then returns to his command post to look upon his wedding photo and dream of his wife and children at a country estate. He is presumably killed when a tank shell hits the post.

Part II:

During the Chinese Revolution in 1949, three couples flee from China to the island of Taiwan. The captain of their ship gets drunk, causing their vessel to collide with another ship. It starts rocking the bottom slowly. All the passengers are trying to survive. Zekun, uses his medical knowledge to help the injured. Yu Zhen, telling she used to be a nurse, helps Zekun. Some selfish men try to steal the life buoys even from the children. One of them stabs Zekun, who slowly dies, having the vision of his Japanese girlfriend that had taken her own life over grief earlier. He dies happily, rocking bottom. Yu Zhen is reunited with the injured Tong Daqing, and he loses the notebook that Lei Yifang had given him in the previous movie. Yu Zhen finds it, they reunite. They're holding onto a piece of the ship and the sunrise comes. There are 34 survivors. An American ship saves them. 4 months pass. Zhou Yunfen has given birth to Lei Yifang's son, but she doesn't know what happened to her husband. Tong Daqing arrives at her house to tell her the bad news. He also tells her that he could bring Lei Yifang's diary thanks to Yu Zhen. Zhou Yunfen not only thanks Tong Daqing but also Yu Zhen.

Cast 

 Zhang Ziyi as Yu Zhen
 Takeshi Kaneshiro as Yan Zenkun
 Song Hye-kyo as Zhou Yunfen 
 Huang Xiaoming as Lei Yifang 
 Tong Dawei as Tong Daqing
 Masami Nagasawa as Masako Shimura
 Qin Hailu
 Faye Yu
 Tony Yang
 Yang Kuei-mei
 Cong Shan
 Angeles Woo
 Yu Zhen
 Wang Qianyuan
 Bowie Lam
 Lin Mei-hsiu
 Jack Kao
 Denny Huang as Yang Tianhu
 Kou Chia-jui
 Xu Huanhuan
 You Yong
 Liu Yiwei
 Hitomi Kuroki
 Johnny Kou
 Fang Qingzhuo
 Bamboo Chen

Production 
Zhao Fei is the director of photography and Taro Iwashiro provided the scores for the film.

The film's original script was written by Wang Hui-ling, who had scripted films for Taiwanese director Ang Lee, such as Eat Drink Man Woman (1994), Crouching Tiger, Hidden Dragon (2000) and Lust, Caution (2007). A new script written by John Woo, and Taiwanese filmmakers Su Chao-pin and Chen Ching-hui was described as "considerably altered".

The filming began on The Crossing on July 6, 2013 in Beijing. Other shooting locations included Inner Mongolia, Shanghai, Taiwan and Tianjin.

Release 
The film was released in stereoscopic 3D. On September 9, 2014, Beijing Galloping Horse announced that the film would be released in two parts with the first part set to release in China on December 2, 2014.

The first official trailer for the film was released on September 22, 2014.

The Crossing opened at first-place at the China box office on December 2, 2014 which accounted for about 37.3% of all screenings in China grossing RMB24.0 million (US$3.91 million). The film was shown in 3-D and IMAX 3-D. The film was released in Hong Kong on December 25, 2014.

References

External links 
 

2014 films
2010s Mandarin-language films
2014 romantic drama films
2014 3D films
2015 3D films
China Film Group Corporation films
Chinese 3D films
Chinese romantic drama films
Chinese war films
Chinese epic films
Hong Kong 3D films
Hong Kong drama films
Films directed by John Woo
Films scored by Taro Iwashiro
Films set in 1949
Films shot in Beijing
Films shot in Inner Mongolia
Films shot in Shanghai
Films shot in Taiwan
Films shot in Tianjin
IMAX films
Le Vision Pictures films
2010s Hong Kong films